Alan Knipe (born January 1, 1969) is the head coach of the Long Beach State 49ers men's volleyball team and head coach of the 2012 Olympic Team United States men's national volleyball team. He played and coached at Long Beach State. As a player, he helped the team win the 1991 NCAA championship and an appearance in the 1990 NCAA Championships. and as a coach, he has guided them to seven final four appearances (2004, 2008, 2016, 2017, 2018, 2019, 2022) and two national championships (2018, 2019). As a player, assistant coach and head coach, Knipe has helped Long Beach to 10 of the programs 12 NCAA Final four appearances.

Playing career
Knipe played on the Long Beach State 49ers men's volleyball team from 1990 to 1992. In 1991, he was named to the All-America second team and helped the 49ers win the NCAA championship final. In 1992, he was named to the All-America first team.

Knipe then played for the U.S. national team in 1992 and 1993. Knipe played professionally in Italy and Belgium. He also played on the Bud Light 4-Man Pro Beach Volleyball Tour.

Coaching career

College
Knipe was the men's head volleyball coach at Golden West College in 1994 and 1995. In 1995, along with Co-Head Coach and former LBSU teammate Patrick Sullivan, led the team to the California State JC championship. The championship was the first in school history for the men's team.

Knipe then became an assistant coach at Long Beach State in 1996. He was named the head coach in 2000. In 2004, he led the team to a 28-7 record and into the NCAA final. He was named the AVCA National Coach of the Year.

In 2005 and 2006, Knipe led Long Beach State to the MPSF Tournament finals. In 2008, he led the team to the NCAA Tournament semifinals and was named MPSF Coach of the Year and Volleyball Magazine Coach of the Year. Following the 2009 season, knipe took the best three seasons off to coach the USA men's Olympic Team. Upon his return to the Beach in 2013, Knipe wasted no time in getting Long Beach state back to the top of the NCAA. The 2013 49ers advanced to the conference title game and one match away from the Final Four. Knipe lead Long Beach State to Four straight NCAA Final Four appearances from 2016-2019. In 2018 and 2019, Knipe led Long Beach State to the NCAA Championship. The back to back championships are a first in Long Beach State Athletics history. Knipe was named AVCA Coach of the year in 2017 and 2018. He was also named conference coach of the year in 2017, 2018, and 2019. He had developed the NCAA player of the year in 2008, 2013, 2017, 2018, 2019 and 2022 (Paul Lotman ‘08, Talor Crabb ‘13, TJ Defalco ‘17, Josh Tuaniga ‘17, and TJ Defalco ‘19, Alex Nikolov ‘22.)

International
Knipe became the head coach of the U.S. national team in 2009. He led the team to gold medals at the 2010, 2011 and 2012 and a silver medal at the 2009 at the NORCECA Continental Championships and the 2012 FIVB World League. Knipe lead Team USA to the World League Finals in 2009, 2011, and 2012. At the 2012 Summer Olympics, the U.S. finished tied for fifth, winning their pool and finishing with a 4-2 record.

Personal life
Knipe graduated from Marina High School in 1987 and from Long Beach State in 1992. He lives in Huntington Beach, California, with his wife and two sons, Evan and Aidan.

Head coaching record

NCAA

Junior college

References

External links
 
 Long Beach State bio

1969 births
Living people
American men's volleyball players
American volleyball coaches
National team coaches
Long Beach State Beach men's volleyball players
American Olympic coaches
Sportspeople from Huntington Beach, California